Calopteryx hyalina is a species of broad-winged damselfly in the family Calopterygidae.

The IUCN conservation status of Calopteryx hyalina is "EN", endangered. The species faces a high risk of extinction in the near future. The population is decreasing. The IUCN status was reviewed in 2010.

References

Further reading

 

Calopterygidae
Articles created by Qbugbot
Insects described in 1909